The BMW M57 is a straight-6 diesel engine produced from 1998 up to 2013 in BMW's upper Austrian engine plant in Steyr.

Description 

The M57 is a water-cooled and turbocharged inline six cylinder diesel engine with common-rail-injection. It was revised twice during its production time. It is based on its predecessor M51. The block and the crankcase of the first M57 engines and the TÜ (Technische Überarbeitung = revision) engines are made of cast iron, whilst the TÜ2 engines are made of aluminium instead. The combustion chamber was also changed in the TÜ2. For fuel injection, magnetic injectors are used, except from the TÜ2 OL and TOP engines, which make use of piezo injectors. The common-rail-system is made by Bosch and also controlled by a Bosch DDE 4 ECU for non TÜ and DDE 5 ECU for TÜ. All models are equipped with turbocharger and an intercooler. The 2.9L M57, which is found in E39 530d and E38 730d, as well as early models of E46 330d and E53 X5, is equipped with one Garrett GT2556V turbocharger. The 2.5L M57TÜ uses a Garrett GT2056V turbocharger, the 3.0L M57TÜ a Garrett GT2260V turbocharger, the M57TÜ2 a Garrett GT2260VK turbocharger, whilst the M57D30TÜTOP sports a BorgWarner KP39 high-pressure and a K26 low-pressure turbocharger. The compression ratio reaches from 16.5:1 to 18.0:1, M57 engines with higher power output and more than one turbocharger have a lower compression ratio. Every cylinder has two inlet and two exhaust valves as well as two chain-driven overhead camshafts. The redline is 4750 rpm.

Technical data

Applications

M57D25
Bore x stroke: 
 2000 - 2003 in the BMW E39 525d (120 kW)
 2001 - 2003 in the Opel Omega B 2.5DTI

M57D25TÜ
Bore x stroke: 
 2003 - 2007 in the BMW E60/E61 525d  or

M57D30
Bore x stroke: 
  and 
 in the Range Rover L322
  and 
 in the E39 as  530d
 in the E46 as 330d/330xd
  and 
 in the E38 as 730d
 in the E53 as X5 3.0d
  and 
 in the E39 as 530d
  and 
 in the E38 as 730d

M57D30TÜ 
Bore x stroke: 
  and 
 in the E46 as 330d/330Cd/330xd
 in the E83 as X3 3.0d
  and 
 in the E53 as X5 3.0d
 in the E60/E61 as 530d/530xd
 in the E65/E66 as 730d
 in the E83 as X3 3.0d

M57D30TÜ TOP
Bore x stroke: 
 and 
 in the E60/E61 as 535d
 in the E63/E64 as 635d

M57D30TÜ2 
Bore x stroke: 
  and 
 in the E90/E91/E92/E93 as 325d
 in the E60/E61 as 525d
  and 
 in the E65/E66 as 730d
 in the E90/E91/E92/E93 as 330d/330xd
 in the E60/E61 as 530d/530xd
  and 
 in the E60/E61 as 530d
 in the E70 as X5 xDrive30d
 in the E71 as X6 xDrive30d

M57D30TÜ2TOP 
Bore x stroke: 
  and 
 in the E60/E61 as 535d
 in the E63/E64 as 635d
 in the E70 as X5 3.0sd
 in the E71 as X6 xDrive35d
 in the E83 as X3 3.0sd
 in the E90/E91/E92 as 335d

See also
 List of BMW engines

References

External links
BMW Heaven - The BMW Knowledge Base
The UnixNerd's BMW M57 engine page with photos, history and common problems.

M57
Straight-six engines
Diesel engines by model